This is a list of heritage railways in Canada. For convenience, heritage tramways have also been included.

Current heritage railways

British Columbia

Alberni Pacific Railway
BC Forest Discovery Centre
Fort Steele Steam Railway (also known as the East Kootenay Railway Co).
Fraser Valley Heritage Railway
Kamloops Heritage Railway
Kettle Valley Steam Railway
Nelson Electric Tramway
West Coast Railway Association (future railway)

Yukon
White Pass and Yukon Route - Originates in Alaska and passes through British Columbia.

Alberta
Alberta Railway Museum
Alberta Prairie Railway Excursions
Aspen Crossing Railway
Fort Edmonton Park
Galt Historic Railway Park - County of Warner No. 5, Alberta
High Level Bridge Streetcar
Heritage Park Historical Village Railway
Rocky Mountain Rail Society
Royal Canadian Pacific

Saskatchewan
Southern Prairie Railway
Wheatland Express Excursion Train

Manitoba
Prairie Dog Central Railway

Ontario
Agawa Canyon Railway
Halton County Radial Railway
Port Stanley Terminal Rail
Port Elgin and North Shore Railroad
South Simcoe Railway
Toronto Transportation Commission operates a historical bus and streetcar fleet for charter. 
Waterloo Central Railway
York Durham Heritage Railway
Huntsville and Lake of Bays Transportation Company

Quebec
Canadian Railway Museum
 Charlevoix Railway
 Train touristique de Charlevoix Inc.

New Brunswick
New Brunswick Railway Museum

Former heritage railways
Whitehorse trolley
Hull-Chelsea-Wakefield Railway
Vancouver Downtown Historic Railway

Standard services operating heritage equipment

While not considered heritage railways, three passenger railways operate equipment built in the 1960s and earlier.

Ontario Northland Railway operates a passenger service between Cochrane and Moosonee making use of a fleet with heritage value.
Via Rail Canada operates equipment dating back as far as 1947 on all its routes, notably featuring Park Cars built by Canadian Pacific Railway on The Canadian, The Ocean, the Jasper to Prince Rupert Train, and the Winnipeg-Churchill train. Illustrating the heritage value of this fleet, one of its cars is already on display at The Canadian Railway Museum in Montreal. Via Rail also continues to operate RDCs on the Sudbury-White River train in Ontario.
 The Tshiuetin Railway in Labrador operates a vintage fleet of passenger cars in regular service.

See also

List of Canadian railways
List of heritage railways

References 

Heritage railways
Canada
Heritage
Heritage railways